Salvatore Aloi (born 11 November 1996) is an Italian professional football player who plays as a midfielder for  club Pescara.

Club career
He made his Serie B debut for Trapani on 22 May 2015 in a game against Pro Vercelli.

On 15 September 2020, he joined Avellino on a 2-year contract.

On 18 August 2022, Aloi moved to Pescara.

References

External links
 
 
 

1996 births
Living people
Sportspeople from the Metropolitan City of Reggio Calabria
Italian footballers
Association football midfielders
Serie B players
Serie C players
Reggina 1914 players
Trapani Calcio players
S.S. Akragas Città dei Templi players
Lupa Roma F.C. players
U.S. Avellino 1912 players
Delfino Pescara 1936 players
Footballers from Calabria